Neukloster-Warin is an Amt in the district of Nordwestmecklenburg, in Mecklenburg-Vorpommern, Germany. The seat of the Amt is in Neukloster.

The Amt Neukloster-Warin consists of the following municipalities:
Bibow 
Glasin 
Jesendorf 
Lübberstorf 
Neukloster
Passee 
Warin
Zurow 
Züsow

Ämter in Mecklenburg-Western Pomerania